Max Denmark MH (born 1999) is a Hong Kong rugby union player.

Denmark was educated at Island School and Millfield School.

Denmark plays for the Hong Kong national rugby sevens team and Hong Kong rugby union team. He captained the Hong Kong U19 Team to victory at the Asian Rugby U19 Championships in 2018. He competed for Hong Kong at the 2022 Rugby World Cup Sevens in Cape Town.

International Statistics 
As of 6 November 2022, or after the 2022 Hong Kong Sevens.

References

1999 births
Hong Kong rugby union players
Living people
Hong Kong international rugby sevens players
People educated at Island School
Rugby union players at the 2018 Asian Games
Asian Games gold medalists for Hong Kong
Medalists at the 2018 Asian Games
Asian Games medalists in rugby union
People educated at Millfield